Vijayakumar Menon (1945/1946 – 1 November 2022) was an Indian art critic, writer, translator and art teacher from Kerala. He was a winner of several awards including the Kerala Lalithakala Akademi Award for best book on art, Kerala Sahitya Akademi’s endowment for scholarly literature, Kesari Puraskaram, and Gurudarsanam Award.

Vijayakumar Menon was born as the son of Chettakkal Madhom Karthyayini Amma and Ananthan Pillai from Elamakkara, Ernakulam.  After graduation from Kalady Sree Sankara College, he joined FACT in 1966. After about 18 years of service, he resigned from FACT and joined Maharaja Sayajirao University of Baroda to pursue studies in art and art history and secured a M A degree in Art History. Later, he worked as an art teacher at Mysore College of Visual Arts, RLV College of Music and Fine Arts in Tripunithura, Sree Sankaracharya University of  Sanskrit, College of Fine Arts, Thrissur, and Guruvayur Institute of Mural paintings.

Menon was unmarried and had been living in Jnana Ashram in Vyasagiri, Wadakkancherry, Thrissur, Kerala and Vyasa Tapovanam since 1989.
Menon died on 1 November 2022, at the age of 76.

Books authored by Vijayakumar Menon
The books on art and art history authored by Vijayakumar Menon include:

Bharathiya Kala Charitram (History of Indian Art), Kerala Sahitya Akademi, 2011
Bharathiya Lavanya Darsanavum Kala Parasparyavum
Kerala Kala Samskaram, Kerala Lalithakala Akademi, 2021
Adhunika Kaladarsanam
Ravivarma Padanam
Bharathiya Chitrakala-Irupatham Noottandil, D C Books, 2021
Authenticating Objectivity: Paintings of Dr A R Poduval, Kerala Lalithakala Akademi, 2010
Chitrakala: Charihravum Riithikalum, 2007
A brief survey of the art scenario of Kerala, 2007
Puzhhayude Nattariv, D C Books, 2008
Kanayi Kunhiraman, 2008
K. Madhavamenon : Prakrithi, Lavanyam, Dharsanam, Kerala Lalithakala Akademi, 2012
Sthalam, Kaalam Kala, 2006

Vijayakumar Menon translated into Malayalam several plays by western playwrights. These include:

The Chairs by French dramatist Eugène Ionesco
Blood Wedding by Spanish dramatist Federico García Lorca
The Maids by the French dramatist Jean Genet

References

1940s births
2022 deaths
Indian art critics
Indian art educators
People from Kerala